The Department of Forest Conservation (Sinhala: වන සංරක්‍ෂණ දෙපාර්තමේන්තුව Vana Sanrakshana Departhamenthuwa) is a non-ministerial government department responsible for forestry in Sri Lanka. Its mission is to protect and expand Sri Lanka's forests and woodlands. The head of the department is the Conservator General, Dr. K.M.A.Bandara. It comes under the purview of the Ministry of Wildlife and Forest Resource Conservation.

It has limited policing powers in protected forest areas to stop illegal poaching and logging, with the power to arrest suspects.

Forests 
Some of the forests managed by the Department of Forest Conservation are:

 Hurulu Man and Biosphere Reserve, 1977
 Sinharaja Man and Biosphere Reserve, 1978 
 Kanneliya-Dediyagala-Nakiyadeniya (KDN), 2004

See also
Law enforcement in Sri Lanka

References

External links
 Department of Forest Conservation

Forest Conservation
Forest Conservation
Nature conservation in Sri Lanka
Sri Lanka
Forestry in Sri Lanka
Environmental organisations based in Sri Lanka